Bambill South is a locality situated on the Bambill South Road in the Sunraysia region. The place by road, is about 6 kilometres east from Kurnwill and 19 kilometres west from Tarrango. Many farmers such as Mangans, Stanbrooks, and Hards settled in the area.

References

See also
 Werrimull, Victoria